Gaozeng station, formerly Aigang station during planning, is an interchange station of Line 3 and Line 9 on the Guangzhou Metro. The underground station is located at the south of Guangzhou Baiyun International Airport in Baiyun District. The station opened for both lines when Line 9 went into operation on 28 December 2017.

Station layout

Exits

References

External links

Guangzhou Metro stations in Baiyun District
Railway stations in China opened in 2017